Phil Doherty (born 10 April 1951) is a former Australian rules footballer who played with North Melbourne in the Victorian Football League (VFL).

Notes

External links 

Living people
1951 births
Australian rules footballers from Victoria (Australia)
North Melbourne Football Club players
Wangaratta Rovers Football Club players